The 2021 Italian Grand Prix (officially known as the Formula 1 Heineken Gran Premio d'Italia 2021) was a Formula One motor race held on 12 September 2021 at Autodromo Nazionale Monza. It was the 14th round of the 2021 Formula One World Championship and the second Grand Prix in Italy of the season, after the Emilia Romagna Grand Prix on 18 April. The 53 lap race was won by McLaren driver Daniel Ricciardo. Teammate Lando Norris finished second and Mercedes Valtteri Bottas was third. It was Ricciardo’s first victory since the 2018 Monaco Grand Prix and McLaren's first victory since Jenson Button at the 2012 Brazilian Grand Prix and McLaren's first 1-2 finish since the 2010 Canadian Grand Prix, and also McLaren's first win at Monza since the 2012 Italian Grand Prix.

Background 

The event, held over the weekend of 10–12 September at the Autodromo Nazionale Monza, was the fourteenth round of the 2021 World Championship. The race took place one week after the Dutch Grand Prix and precedes the Russian Grand Prix. It was the home Grand Prix for Antonio Giovinazzi, Ferrari and AlphaTauri. Pierre Gasly is the previous race winner, having won the 2020 event.

Championship standings before the race 
After Max Verstappen's win at the Dutch Grand Prix, he took the lead of the Drivers' Championship with 224.5 points. He led Lewis Hamilton by three points. Valtteri Bottas' third place at the previous race saw him jump Lando Norris, leaving Bottas in third, trailing his teammate by 98.5 points. Norris was fourth, on 114 points, while Sergio Pérez was fifth, eight points behind Norris.

Mercedes retained their lead of the Constructors' Championship, leading Red Bull by 12 points. After a double points finish, Ferrari jumped McLaren into third place, with McLaren 11.5 points behind. Alpine stayed fifth, 80 points behind McLaren.

Entrants 

The drivers and teams were the same as the season entry list with the only exception being Kimi Räikkönen, who was replaced by Robert Kubica, as was the case in the preceding , when Räikkönen tested positive for coronavirus.

Tyre choices 
Sole tyre supplier Pirelli allocated the C2, C3, and C4 compounds of tyre to be used in the race.

Weekend format 
The event was the second, of three, to implement a trial weekend format. The first race to use this format occurred during the British Grand Prix. The change in format means that Free practice 1 and qualifying took place on the Friday. Free practice 2 and sprint qualifying took place on the Saturday, while the race is the sole event on the Sunday.

The sprint qualifying is a  race which would decide the starting order for the race on Sunday, for this event this is equivalent to 18 laps. The grid order for sprint qualifying was decided via the normal Q1, Q2, Q3 qualifying session. The final classification of the sprint qualifying race would be the starting grid for the race. The winner of the sprint qualifying would be on pole. Additionally, sprint qualifying awards points to the top three finishers: 3 for 1st, 2 for 2nd, and 1 for 3rd. The maximum time limit is 60 minutes, and normal fuel flow limits still apply. The top three in sprint qualifying would also be given a victory parade and special wreaths for their efforts.

Practice 
Free practice 1 took place at 14:30 CEST on 10 September. The first practice ended with no major incidents. Lewis Hamilton set the fastest time, with Max Verstappen in second and Valtteri Bottas in third.

Free practice 2 took place at 12:00 CEST on 11 September. The first practice ended with one interruption. The red flag was brought out when Carlos Sainz Jr. spun and crashed at the Ascari chicane. He said over the radio that it "hurt" but he was cleared during the precautionary checks. The other Ferrari of Charles Leclerc, had to stop his session early because he was feeling unwell. His situation was monitored by medical staff and ultimately, he was cleared to take part in the Sprint. The session ended with Hamilton in first, Bottas in second and Verstappen in third.

Qualifying 
Qualifying took place at 18:00 CEST on 10 September. All three parts of qualifying ended with no major incidents. At the end of the first part of qualifying, Lewis Hamilton was fastest, with Valtteri Bottas second and Lando Norris third. The second part of qualifying saw Hamilton, Bottas and Norris go first, second and third, respectively. The final part of qualifying saw Bottas go fastest, with Hamilton second and Max Verstappen third.

Qualifying classification

Sprint qualifying 
Sprint qualifying took place at 16:30 CEST on 11 September. Valtteri Bottas kept first from the start and led all laps of the race. Lewis Hamilton lost four places at the second corner. He managed to make up one place, due to Pierre Gasly crashing out at Curva Grande. Gasly's crash was caused by contact with Daniel Ricciardo. The damage meant Gasly's front wing came off and subsequently went under his car, bouncing him through the gravel and into the wall. The stewards deemed it a racing incident and didn't apportion blame for the contact. The safety car was deployed due to this crash. Yuki Tsunoda and Robert Kubica also made contact on lap 1, resulting in Tsunoda losing his front wing and Kubica spinning into the gravel. Both drivers were able to carry on.

After lap 1, the positions of the top 8 drivers did not change. The session ended with Valtteri Bottas, Max Verstappen, and Daniel Ricciardo finishing on the top three positions respectively. However, while Bottas finished first in sprint qualifying, Verstappen took pole position for the race, due to Bottas having a penalty for exceeding his quota of engine components, which demoted him to 19th. Ricciardo and his McLaren teammate, Lando Norris, was promoted to second and third for the grid respectively.

In the aftermath of the sprint qualifying, Sergio Pérez criticised the format, saying the sprint at Monza was "very boring" and did not add anything. Formula One managing director Ross Brawn defended it, saying there was "plenty of action". Fernando Alonso advocated for single lap qualifying (the qualifying system in Formula One previously used from the start of the  season to end of the  season) as a method of setting the grid for sprint qualifying.

Sprint qualifying classification 

 Notes
  – Valtteri Bottas was required to start the race from the back of the grid for exceeding his quota of power unit elements.
  – Pierre Gasly received a five-place grid penalty for an unscheduled gearbox change. He was also required to start the race from the back of the grid for exceeding his quota of power unit elements. He was then required to start the race from the pit lane for a new energy store specification.

Race 
The race started at 15:00 CEST on 12 September. Daniel Ricciardo overtook Max Verstappen at the start to take the lead of the race while Lewis Hamilton passed Lando Norris at the start to take third position. Hamilton attempted an overtake on Verstappen into turn 4, but was pushed wide, causing him to lose positions to Verstappen and Norris. Further down the grid, Antonio Giovinazzi went off the track at turn 5 and rejoined the track into the path of Carlos Sainz Jr., with the two making contact. Giovinazzi was spun around and clipped the barrier, losing his front wing. Giovinazzi was given a 5-second time penalty for rejoining the track in an unsafe manner.

Ricciardo held Verstappen behind for 21 laps, until he pitted for hard tyres on lap 22. Verstappen entered the pits on the next lap, but was held for 11.1 seconds due to an issue with the right front tyre. While Verstappen was in the pits, Hamilton overtook Norris, prompting Norris to pit. Norris came out of the pits ahead of Verstappen, and Hamilton pitted for medium tyres on the following lap. Hamilton's stop was also slow, being stationary for 4.2 seconds. Due to this, Norris was able to overtake him, and Hamilton ended up side-by-side with Verstappen on the pit exit and into turn 1. Verstappen was squeezed into turn 2, bouncing over a sausage kerb and making contact with Hamilton's left rear tyre, launching Verstappen's car into the air and over the top of Hamilton's car. Both drivers were uninjured, but were forced to retire from the race. This was Hamilton's first retirement in 63 races, the previous being the 2018 Austrian Grand Prix.

The crash brought out the safety car. Charles Leclerc and George Russell took advantage by pitting during the safety car period, resulting in Leclerc and Russell exiting the pits in second and ninth, respectively. On the safety car restart, Norris overtook Leclerc to move up into second place. A few laps later, Sergio Pérez attempted an overtake on Leclerc into turn 4, but went off the track; Pérez took third place from Leclerc, but was given a 5-second time penalty for leaving the track and gaining an advantage. On lap 34, Valtteri Bottas overtook Leclerc to take fourth place. Pérez held off Bottas until the end of the race, but dropped to fifth after the race due to his penalty.

Ricciardo finished first, winning his first race since the 2018 Monaco Grand Prix, and taking the first win for McLaren since Jenson Button did so for the team at the 2012 Brazilian Grand Prix. Norris finished second, making it a one-two finish for McLaren; their first since the 2010 Canadian Grand Prix when Lewis Hamilton and Jenson Button were driving for the team. Bottas rounded out the podium places, finishing the race in third. Damage to his Aston Martin's front wing meant that Sebastian Vettel could not finish higher than twelfth. Kubica's fourteenth-place finish allowed him to move ahead of Nikita Mazepin into twentieth place in the  standings.

Post-race 
After the race, Verstappen and Hamilton were summoned to the stewards regarding their crash. The stewards ruled that Verstappen was predominantly at fault and awarded him a three-place grid penalty for the following race in Sochi, as well as two penalty points on his Super Licence. Hamilton said he was proud of the stewards for being willing to give Verstappen a penalty for the incident. Three-time Formula One World Champion Sir Jackie Stewart criticised Verstappen's behaviour following the incident with Hamilton, saying he was "taking longer than expected to mature".  The FIA will also carry out a safety investigation into the Hamilton-Verstappen crash after considering it an 'unusual incident'. Meanwhile, race winner Ricciardo stated that that was the first time he had ever been overwhelmed by winning, especially considering he had been consistently outperformed by teammate Lando Norris in the first half of the season. Norris himself felt he could have challenged Ricciardo, but decided it would be in the best interests of the McLaren team not to, fearing challenging his teammate could have resulted in a Hamilton-Verstappen-style crash between the pair.

Race classification 

 Notes
  – Includes one point for fastest lap.
  – Sergio Pérez finished third, but received a five-second time penalty for leaving the track and gaining an advantage.
  – Yuki Tsunoda did not start the race. His place on the grid was left vacant.

Championship standings after the race

Drivers' Championship standings

Constructors' Championship standings

 Note: Only the top five positions are included for both sets of standings.

See also 
 2021 Monza Formula 2 round

Notes

References

External links 

Italian
Grand Prix
Italian Grand Prix
Italian Grand Prix